Cameron Young (born May 7, 1997) is an American professional golfer.

High school and amateur career
In high school, Young played on the golf team at Fordham Preparatory School in The Bronx.

Young would later commit to Wake Forest University.

Professional career
Young Monday qualified for the Korn Ferry Tour's Pinnacle Bank Championship in late July 2020 and tied for 11th, giving him entry to the next event; a string of four finishes of 16th or better, culminating with a tie for second at the Nationwide Children's Hospital Championship, earned him enough points to become a special temporary member for the rest of the 2020–21 season.

Young won back-to-back Korn Ferry Tour events in May 2021 and went on to finish 19th on the 2020–21 regular-season points list, earning a PGA Tour card for 2021–22.

In February 2022, Young tied for second at the Genesis Invitational and rose into the top 100 of the Official World Golf Ranking. In May 2022, Young tied for third at the 2022 PGA Championship.

In the first round of the 2022 Open Championship, Young shot a bogey-free round of eight-under-par 64 to top the leaderboard by two shots. He went on to finish second at 19-under, one shot behind Cameron Smith.

In September 2022, Young was selected for the U.S. team in the 2022 Presidents Cup; he won one, tied one and lost two of the four matches he played.

Young won the PGA Tour Rookie of the Year (Arnold Palmer Award) with 94% of the vote.

Personal life
Young will appear in the sports documentary series Full Swing, premiering on Netflix on February 15, 2023.

Professional wins (3)

Korn Ferry Tour wins (2)

Other wins (1)

Other playoff record (1–0)

Results in major championships
Results not in chronological order in 2020.

CUT = missed the half-way cut
"T" indicates a tie for a place
NT = No tournament due to COVID-19 pandemic

Results in The Players Championship

CUT = missed the halfway cut
"T" indicates a tie for a place

Results in World Golf Championships

1Canceled due to the COVID-19 pandemic

"T" = Tied
NT = No tournament

U.S. national team appearances
Professional
Presidents Cup: 2022 (winners)

See also
2021 Korn Ferry Tour Finals graduates

References

External links

American male golfers
PGA Tour golfers
Wake Forest Demon Deacons men's golfers
Korn Ferry Tour graduates
Fordham Preparatory School alumni
People from Briarcliff Manor, New York
1997 births
Living people